Othmar Eiterer is an Austrian retired slalom canoeist who competed in the 1940s and the 1950s. He won two gold medals at the ICF Canoe Slalom World Championships, earning them in 1949 (Folding K-1) and 1951 (Folding K-1 team).

References

Austrian male canoeists
Living people
Year of birth missing (living people)
Medalists at the ICF Canoe Slalom World Championships